The 1942 The Citadel Bulldogs football team represented The Citadel, The Military College of South Carolina in the 1942 college football season.  Bo Rowland served as head coach for the third season.  The Bulldogs played as members of the Southern Conference and played home games at Johnson Hagood Stadium.  No team would be fielded again until 1946 due to World War II.

Schedule

References

Citadel
The Citadel Bulldogs football seasons
Citadel Bulldogs football